Logierieve railway station was a railway station in Logierieve, Aberdeenshire.

History
Logierieve railway station was opened on 18 July 1861, originally under the name Newburgh Road Station. The name changed to Logierive in October 1862. On 4 October 1965, the train station closed.

References

Sources

External links
 RAILSCOT on Formartine and Buchan Railway

Disused railway stations in Aberdeenshire
Railway stations in Great Britain opened in 1861
Railway stations in Great Britain closed in 1965
Beeching closures in Scotland
Former Great North of Scotland Railway stations
1861 establishments in Scotland
1965 disestablishments in Scotland